CECO Environmental is a company founded in 1966 and now is based in Cincinnati, Ohio. The company provides air pollution control technology, products and services for various industries, including aerospace, brick, cement, steel, printing, food, foundries, utilities, woodworking, chemical processing, glass, automotive, ethanol, pharmaceuticals and refining. Currently (2013.12) the company owns twelve subsidiaries.
CECO Environmental acquired Met-Pro Corporation in August 2013.

Products 
CECO Environmental ‘s products consist of two parts: Engineered Systems and Industrial Process Solutions.
 Engineered Systems: The Company serves the Power Generation, Refinery, Water/Wastewater, and Oil & Gas markets. We are a key part of helping meet the global demand for environmental and equipment protection through our highly engineered emissions management, product recovery, and water & gas separation solutions.
 Industrial Process Solutions: The Company's Industrial Process Solutions segment serves the broad Air Pollution Control, Electric Vehicle production, Food and Beverage, Semi-Conductor, Process Filtration, Pharmaceutical, Petrochemical, Wastewater treatment, Wood manufacturing, Desalination, and Aquaculture markets. We protect the air we collectively breathe, maintain clean and safe operations for employees, lower energy consumption and minimize waste for customers, and ensure they meet regulatory compliance standards for toxic emissions, fumes, volatile organic compounds, and odors. Our market leading technologies include particulate filtration, chemical & thermal abatement, industrial ventilation, and pumps & filtration equipment for mission-critical applications.

References

External links
 Official website

Technology companies of the United States
Air pollution control systems
Air pollution in the United States
Manufacturing companies based in Cincinnati
American companies established in 1966
Technology companies established in 1966
1966 establishments in Ohio
1966 in the environment
Companies listed on the Nasdaq